Rafael William Dias Pinheiro (born 30 September 2001), known as Rafael William, is a Brazilian footballer who plays as a goalkeeper for Sampaio Corrêa, on loan from Coritiba.

Club career
Born in Salto, São Paulo, Rafael William joined Cruzeiro's youth setup at the age of 13. Released by the club in the end of 2016, he subsequently moved to Coritiba.

Promoted to the first team for the 2022 season, Rafael William made his debut with the main squad on 2 February of that year, starting in a 2–0 Campeonato Paranaense home win over Rio Branco-PR. A backup to Alex Muralha, he made his Série A debut on 12 June, starting in a 2–0 home loss to Palmeiras as Muralha was injured.

Career statistics

Honours
Coritiba
Campeonato Paranaense: 2022

References

External links
Coritiba profile 

2001 births
Living people
Sportspeople from São Paulo (state)
Brazilian footballers
Association football goalkeepers
Campeonato Brasileiro Série A players
Coritiba Foot Ball Club players
People from Salto, São Paulo